Slaven Kandić (born 2 April 1991) is a Montenegrin water polo player. He competed in the 2020 Summer Olympics.

References

1991 births
Living people
Water polo players at the 2020 Summer Olympics
Montenegrin male water polo players
Olympic water polo players of Montenegro
Water polo goalkeepers